Isostola rhodobroncha is a moth of the family Erebidae. It was described by Felder in 1874. It is found in Brazil.

References

Arctiinae
Moths described in 1874